Tales From The Acoustic Planet is an album by American banjoist Béla Fleck. It is a jazzy album with roots in bluegrass, where Fleck is joined by bluegrass stars (Sam Bush, Tony Rice, Jerry Douglas), as well as his jazz friends (Chick Corea, Branford Marsalis, Paul McCandless) and Flecktones members (Victor Wooten, Future Man). This is also his first solo album since 1988's Places.

Track listing 
All tracks written by Béla Fleck except where noted.

 Up And Running
 First Light
 The Great Circle Route
 Circus Of Regrets
 Three Bridges Home
 The Landing
 Arkansas Traveler (trad.)
 Backwoods Galaxy
 In Your Eyes
 System Seven
 Cheeseballs In Cowtown
 Bicyclops
 Jayme Lynn
 For Sascha

Personnel
 Béla Fleck - banjo (all tracks)
 Grace Bahng - cello (track 13)
 Sam Bush - mandolin (tracks 10, 11)
 Chick Corea - piano (tracks 8, 9, 12)
 Jerry Douglas - Dobro (tracks 2, 3, 11)
 Stuart Duncan - violin (tracks 3, 6, 10, 11)
 Robert Barry Green - trombone (track 4)
 Connie Heard - violin (track 13)
 Bruce Hornsby - piano (track 3)
 Kenny Malone - drums (tracks 7, 11), percussion (track 10)
 Branford Marsalis - soprano saxophone (track 14), tenor saxophone (track 8)
 Edgar Meyer - upright bass (tracks 2, 4, 6, 7, 9, 10, 13, 14), piano (track 4)
 Paul McCandless - bass clarinet (track 1), English horn (track 5), oboe (tracks 2, 5, 13), soprano saxophone (track 1)
 Matt Mundy - mandolin (tracks 1, 6, 13)
 Tony Rice - guitar (tracks 1, 3, 5, 6)
 Dennis Solee - clarinet (track 4)
 George Tidwell - trumpet (track 4)
 Mary Kathryn Vanosdale - violin (track 13)
 Kristin Wilkinson - viola (track 13)
 Roy "Futureman" Wooten - acoustic percussion (tracks 1, 3, 4, 6, 13), drums (tracks 5, 8), vocal wind effects (track 4)
 Victor Wooten - Bass guitar (tracks 1, 5), fretless bass guitar (tracks 3, 8, 11), Electric upright bass (track 4)
 Recorded and mixed by Bil VornDick

References

1995 albums
Béla Fleck albums
Rounder Records albums